Padishkhwārgar was a Sasanian province in Late Antiquity, which almost corresponded to the present-day provinces of Mazandaran and Gilan. The province bordered Adurbadagan and Balasagan in the west, Gurgan in the east, and Spahan in south. The main cities of the province were Amol and Chalus.

The province functioned as some kind of vassal kingdom, being mostly ruled by princes from different royal families, who bore the title of Padashwargarshah ("Shah of Padishkhwargar").

Name 
The name "Padishkhwargar" is the Bundahishn variation of its name. On Shapur I's inscription at the Ka'ba-ye Zartosht the province is called Parishwar, whilst Islamic sources refer the region as Tabaristan, which derives from Middle Persian Tapurstān.

History 

During the rise of the Sasanian dynasty, Padishkhwargar was ruled by a certain Gushnasp, who aided his suzerain the Parthian ruler Artabanus V in his struggle with the first Sasanian king (shah) Ardashir I over the control of Iran. Artabanus V was eventually defeated and killed, and Gushnasp was made a Sasanian vassal. Gilan, which was never fully incorporated into the Sasanian Empire, still posed a problem for the Sasanians, as Ardashir's son and successor Shapur I had to make an expedition into the region in 242/3. The dynasty of Gushnasp continued to rule Padishkhwargar until c. 520, when the Sasanian prince Kawus was made the new ruler of the province. After returning from an expedition in Zabulistan, Kawus rebelled in c. 532 against his recently crowned brother Khosrow I, claiming himself as the rightful ruler of the empire due to being the elder brother. He was defeated and executed the following year. In the 550s, Karin, a member of the House of Karen, received land to the south of Amol by Khosrow I, thus starting the Qarinvand dynasty.

Population 
The western portion of Padishkhwargar included Gilan and Daylam, which was populated by the Gilaks and Daylamites, who were most likely adherents of some form of Iranian paganism, while a minority of them were Zoroastrian and Christian. According to al-Biruni, they "lived by the rule laid down by the mythical Afridun." They were often associated with each other, and regularly served the Sasanian military as mercenaries, but never fully came under their suzerainty. They both spoke a northern Iranian dialect that was mostly unintelligible with Persian. The Cadusii, who had mixed with Gilaks, lived from the Caspian coast into the mountains. Mazandaran was populated by the Amardi and Tapur tribe, who had intermingled. The non-Iranian tribes of Amariacae and Dribices that lived from the range of Amol to Gurgan, had most likely been assimilated by the Iranians into a prevalent Mazandarani population.

References

Sources 
 

 
 
 
 

Provinces of the Sasanian Empire
History of Mazandaran Province
Tabaristan
224 establishments
States and territories established in the 220s